The 1908–09 St Helens R.F.C. season was the club's 14th in the Northern Rugby Football Union, the 35th in their history. The club finished 17th out of 27 in the NRFU Championship. In the Lancashire League that ran concurrent to the national championship, St Helens finished eighth. In the Challenge Cup, the club were knocked out in the first round by Halifax.

NRFU Championship

References

St Helens R.F.C. seasons
St Helens RLFC season, 1908
St Helens RLFC season, 1909
1909 in English rugby league
1908 in English rugby league